The Old Prince is the second studio album by Canadian rapper Shad, released October 23, 2007 on Black Box Recordings. On June 30, 2009 it was re-released on iTunes on the same label.

Singles
Videos have been made for four tracks from the album, "I Don't Like To", "Brother (Watching)", "Compromise" and "The Old Prince Still Lives At Home". The video for "The Old Prince Still Lives at Home", a spoof of the opening credits to the television series The Fresh Prince of Bel Air, won CBC Radio 3's 2008 Bucky Award for Best Video.

Award nominations
The album was nominated for Rap Recording of the Year at the 2008 Juno Awards.
The album was nominated for the 2008 Polaris Music Prize.

Track listing

References

2007 albums
Shad (rapper) albums
Concept albums